Wor Mamay District is a district of Paktika Province, Afghanistan.  In 2019 its estimated population was 21,404.  The district is within the heartland of the Sulaimankhel tribe of Ghilji Pashtuns.

References

Districts of Paktika Province